Fernand Tardy (14 June 1919 – 4 April 2017) was a French politician. He served as a member of the French Senate from 1980 to 1998, representing Alpes-de-Haute-Provence.

Early life
Fernand Tardy was born on 14 June 1919 in Versailles near Paris. He served in the French Army during World War II, and he joined the French Resistance in 1942.

Career
Tardy served as the mayor of Thoard from 1956 to 1990, and as a senator for Alpes-de-Haute-Provence from 1980 to 1998.

Tardy was the author of two books.

Death
Tardy died on 4 April 2017, at the age of 97.

Works

References

1919 births
2017 deaths
People from Versailles
French military personnel of World War II
French Resistance members
Senators of Alpes-de-Haute-Provence
Mayors of places in Provence-Alpes-Côte d'Azur
French Senators of the Fifth Republic